Matungu Constituency is an electoral constituency in Kenya. It is one of twelve constituencies in Kakamega County and one four in the former Butere/Mumias District. The constituency was established for the 1997 elections.

Members of Parliament 

| 2021 || Peter Oscar Nabulindo|| ANC ||

Wards

References

Constituencies in Kakamega County
Constituencies of Western Province (Kenya)
1997 establishments in Kenya
Constituencies established in 1997